Albano Antonio Carrisi (born 20 May 1943), better known as Al Bano, is an Italian and Albanian tenor, actor, and winemaker. Having sold over 165 million records globally, he is one of the most recognisable Italian singers in the world whose career spans seven decades. He has gained worldwide notability due to his four and a half octave vocal rangeas well as mésalliance with Romina Power, daughter of Hollywood legend Tyrone Power. Carrisi is acclaimed for singing with operatic affinity in pop, rock and italodisco repertoires. In 2016, he was awarded Albanian citizenship due to his close ties with the country and a forename referring to the land.

Biography
He was born in the town of Cellino San Marco (province of Brindisi, Puglia in Southern Italy), where he still lives.

His mother Iolanda Ottino named him Albano because, when he was born, his father Carmelo Carrisi was fighting in Albania for the Royal Italian Army during World War II. He has one brother, Franco Carrisi (Kocis).

He made his debut in 1966 both as a singer, at the Festival delle Rose, and on television.
He won the Disco per l'Estate, an Italian song contest, with "Pensando a te" in 1968. He recorded some major hits such as "La siepe" and "Nel sole" at that time. "Nel sole" sold 600,000 copies in Italy within three months of release in 1967, and eventually over one million copies, and was awarded a gold disc in July 1968.

Soon afterwards, he started a musical collaboration with Romina Power (daughter of the American actor Tyrone Power), whom he married in 1970. After their marriage, they recorded "Storia di due innamorati". They sang as the duo Al Bano & Romina Power for almost thirty years; their work has been especially popular in Italy, Austria, France, Spain, Bulgaria, Romania, Greece and Germany. They released "Dialogo" in 1975 and took part in the Eurovision Song Contest 1976 with the song "We'll Live It All Again" ("Noi lo rivivremo di nuovo"). They sang "Sharazan" in 1981 and the following year they took part in the Sanremo Music Festival with the song "Felicità", which came second. They won first prize in 1984 singing "Ci sarà" and again took part in the Eurovision Song Contest 1985 with "Magic Oh Magic". Both their Eurovision entries placed 7th. Other hits of 1987 include: "Nostalgia canaglia" (awarded 3rd prize at Festival di Sanremo '87) and "Libertà". Those successful songs were followed by "Cara terra mia", which came in third once more at the 1989 Sanremo Music Festival, and "Oggi sposi" which placed 8th at the 1991 Sanremo Music Festival.

Al Bano returned to his solo career in 1996 with "È la mia vita" which was followed by "Verso il sole" in 1997 and "Ancora in volo" in 1999 (that year, his duo – and his marriage – with Romina broke up). He also played in "Herşeye Rağmen" ("Nonetheless" in Turkish) music video of Sima (full name was Sima Sarıkaya), a Turkish singer in 1997. In 2000, Al Bano returned to the Eurovision stage, providing backing vocals for the Swiss entry (performed in Italian) "La vita cos'è?" performed by Jane Bogaert. This song placed 20th out of 24 in the contest. On 16 October 2001, Carrisi was nominated Goodwill Ambassador of the Food and Agriculture Organization of the United Nations (FAO).

In 2005, he starred in the Italian reality show L'isola dei Famosi (Italian  version of Celebrity Survivor) with his daughter, Romina Carrisi. Al Bano returned to Sanremo Music Festival in 2007, where he sang "Nel perdono" which came in second place.

Al Bano still tours all over the world. He is a constant on Italian television and has a large number of fans who follow his career very closely. To date Al Bano has sold 165 million albums around the world. Al Bano has visited Albania a number of times. He was there for a concert in 1989 and has been enjoying great popularity there.

In June 2016 Al Bano was granted the Albanian citizenship due to his close ties with the country and career successes in Albania.

In March 2019 Al Bano was included in the blacklist of the Ukrainian website "Myrotvorets" and the Ukrainian government banned him from entering Ukraine because of his support of the 2014 Russian annexation of Crimea.

In April 2020 Al Bano released a dual-language song in Italian and English praising the natural beauty of Latvia. Terra d'Ambra e di Emozioni / Land of Amber was written and composed by Charles Goodger with Italian lyrics by Alberto Zeppieri. The Latvian Tourist Board used it in a promotional video.

Opera

Al Bano grew up listening to opera for which he had a great passion. He has released several opera albums and is a tenor. In 1997, he released an opera solo album 1997 entitled Concerto Classico, which went double platinum in a short time. Songs he sang on that album include "Una furtiva lagrima", "Va, pensiero", "La nostra serenata", "E lucevan le stelle", and "Ave Maria".

Filmography

Personal life
On 26 July 1970, Al Bano married Romina Power (daughter of the American actor Tyrone Power), who had already started to share her musical career with him, and remained his stage partner for about 30 years.

Carrisi and Power separated in 1999. Their divorce was finalized in 2012. They have a son, Yari (1973), and three daughters: Ylenia Maria (1970) (who went missing in New Orleans in 1994), Cristel Chiara (1985) (starred in the Reality TV show La Fattoria, an Italian version of The Farm) and Romina Iolanda (1987). He has one daughter and one son from girlfriend and showgirl Loredana Lecciso, Jasmine Caterina (2001) and Albano Giovanni (2002).

In the summer of 2013, Al Bano and Romina Power reunited, reportedly only on a professional basis and for one final time, for a concert performance in Moscow. They later performed as guests at the Sanremo Festival 2015. They also performed together in Atlantic City, USA, in April 2015, and following that, in Los Angeles.

On 30 May 2015, Al Bano produced a show at the Arena di Verona, before a sold-out audience of 11,000, in which he starred with Romina Power. The show, featuring Tyrone Power Jr. and other special guests was transmitted by the Italian national TV network RAI, and was watched in over eight countries by 51,000,000 viewers around the globe, a 37 ratings share.

See also
List of celebrities who own wineries and vineyards

Notes

References

External links
Official Website 
Official YouTube Channel
Official Facebook Page
Official Twitter Profile

Al Bano & Romina Power Russian Fansite

1943 births
Living people
Italian male actors
Eurovision Song Contest entrants for Italy
Italian winemakers
Eurovision Song Contest entrants of 1976
Eurovision Song Contest entrants of 1985
People from the Province of Brindisi
Sanremo Music Festival winners
Survivor (franchise) contestants
Participants in Italian reality television series
Power family
20th-century Italian male singers
21st-century Italian male singers